Salla Tykkä (born 1973) is a Finnish artist. She was born in Helsinki, Finland, where she lives and works today. Tykkä graduated from the Academy of Fine Arts 2003. She has been working with photography, video and film since 1996, and she had her first solo show in 1997.

References

External links

Art facts

 
 

1973 births
Living people
Artists from Helsinki
21st-century Finnish women artists
Finnish video artists